Serrivomer sector, known commonly as the sawtooth eel, the saw-tooth snipe or the deep-sea eel, is an eel in the family Serrivomeridae (sawtooth eels). It was described by Samuel Garman in 1899. It is a marine, deep water-dwelling eel which is known from the eastern and western Pacific Ocean, including Japan, Chile, and California, USA.

The species epithet "sector" refers to the manner in which the roof of the eel's mouth is divided into equal parts or "sectors" by the vomer. The diet of S. sector consists primarily of amphipods and zooplankton, as well as small bony fish and cephalopods.

References

Serrivomeridae
Fish described in 1899